Glaucosia is a monotypic moth genus in the subfamily Arctiinae. Its only species, Glaucosia argyllia, is found in Espírito Santo, Brazil. Both the genus and species were first described by George Hampson in 1900.

References

Lithosiini
Monotypic moth genera
Moths of South America